Tebet may refer to:

 Ṭebet, a month in the Hebrew calendar
 Tebet, South Jakarta in Indonesia
 David Tebet (1913–2005), American theater publicist, network executive, and press agent
 Ramez Tebet (1936–2006), Brazilian politician
 Simone Tebet (born 1970), Brazilian politician

See also
 Tibet (disambiguation)